The Latgalian People's Party was a political party in Latvia in the inter-war period.

History
The party first contested national elections in 1922, when it won a single seat in the parliamentary elections that year. However, it did not contest any further elections.

See also
Latgalians (modern)

References

Defunct political parties in Latvia
Latgale